AZD 9272 is a drug which acts as a selective antagonist for the metabotropic glutamate receptor subtype mGluR5. It was unsuccessful in human trials as an analgesic, but continues to be widely used in research especially as its radiolabelled forms.

See also 
 Basimglurant
 Fenobam

References 

MGlu5 receptor antagonists
Fluoroarenes
Pyridines
Nitriles
Oxadiazoles